Yezhovka is a rural locality (a selo) in Mikhaylovsky Selsoviet, Duvansky District, Bashkortostan, Russia. The population was 8 as of 2010. There are 2 streets.

Geography 
Yezhovka is located 46 km west of Mesyagutovo (the district's administrative centre) by road. Tashaulovo is the nearest rural locality.

References 

Rural localities in Duvansky District